The 1970–71 Midland Football Combination season was the 34th in the history of Midland Football Combination, a football competition in England.

Division One

Division One featured 16 clubs which competed in the division last season along with two new clubs:
Knowle, promoted from Division One
Stratford Town Amateurs, transferred from the West Midlands (Regional) League, who also changed name to Stratford Town

League table

References

1970–71
M